Calotropis is a genus of flowering plants in the family Apocynaceae, first described as a genus in 1810. It is native to southern Asia and North Africa.

They are commonly known as milkweeds because of the latex they produce.  Calotropis species are considered common weeds in some parts of the world. The flowers are fragrant and are often used in making floral tassels in some mainland Southeast Asian cultures. Fibers of these plants are called madar or mader.  Calotropis species are usually found in abandoned farmland.

Botanical description

Calotropis gigantea and C. procera are the two most common species in the genus. The leaves are sessile and sub-sessile, opposite, ovate, cordate at the base. The seeds are compressed, broadly ovoid, with a tufted micropylar coma of long silky hair.

Pollination is performed by bees (entomophily) by the following mechanism:

The stigmas and androecia are fused to form a gynostegium. The pollen are enclosed in pollinia (a coherent mass of pollen grains). The pollinia are attached to an adhesive glandular disc at the stigmatic angle. When a bee lands on one of these, the disc adheres to its legs, and the pollinium is detached from the flower when the bee flies away. When the bee visits another flower, the flower is pollinated by the adhering pollinium on the bee.

Species
 Calotropis acia Buch.-Ham. - India
 Calotropis gigantea (L.) Dryand. - China, Indian Subcontinent, Southeast Asia
 Calotropis procera (Aiton) Dryand. - China, Indian Subcontinent, Southeast Asia, Middle East, North Africa

formerly included
Calotropis sussuela, synonym of Hoya imperialis

Toxicity

The milky exudation from the plant is a corrosive poison.  Calotropis species are poisonous plants; calotropin, a compound in the latex, is more toxic than strychnine.  Calotropin is similar in structure to two cardiac glycosides which are responsible for the cytotoxicity of Apocynum cannabinum. Extracts from the flowers of Calotropis procera have shown strong cytotoxic activity. The extracts are also harmful to the eyes.

Cattle often stay away from the plants because of their unpleasant taste and their content of cardiac glycosides.

Cultural significance
The flowers of the plant are offered to the Hindu deities Shiva, Ganesha, Shani Dev and Hanuman.

Gallery

References

External links
 USDA classification for Calotropis
  Calotropis procera
 PIER - Calotropis giantea

Asclepiadoideae
Apocynaceae genera
Taxa named by Robert Brown (botanist, born 1773)
Poisonous plants